Rudolph Howe (15 July 1857 – 2 December 1936) was a South African first-class cricketer. He played for Kimberley in the 1889–90 Currie Cup.

References

External links
 

1857 births
1936 deaths
South African cricketers
Griqualand West cricketers
Cricketers from the Eastern Cape